TBN may mean:

Media
 Trinity Broadcasting Network, an international religious television network
 The Baseball Network, former US television network
 The Buffalo News, a newspaper

Other
 The Barter Network, a commercial trading network
 Toronto Bicycling Network, a recreational cycling organization
 Total base number, an indicator for the alkalinity of lubricant oil
 Trombone, a musical instrument
 Waynesville-St. Robert Regional Airport